The 1993 Australian federal election was held to determine the members of the 37th Parliament of Australia. It was held on 13 March 1993. All 147 seats of the Australian House of Representatives and 40 seats of the 76-seat Australian Senate were up for election. The incumbent government of the centre-left Australian Labor Party led by Paul Keating, the Prime Minister of Australia, was re-elected to a fifth term, defeating the centre-right Liberal/National Coalition led by Opposition Leader John Hewson of the Liberal Party of Australia, and coalition partner Tim Fischer of the National Party of Australia. This was the first, and to date only, time the Labor Party won a fifth consecutive election.

The result was considered an upset, as opinion polls had predicted a Coalition win. In his victory speech, Keating would famously describe the result as "the sweetest victory of all". The Coalition's loss was attributed to the unpopularity of Hewson and his economic policy, popularly known as Fightback! This would be the last time that the Labor Party won a majority at the federal level until the 2007 election. It also remains the only time that the Liberal Party was led by a leader who previously had no experience as a minister.

Background

This was the first election after the end of the late 80s/early 90s recession. The opposition Liberal Party was led by John Hewson, a former professor of economics at the University of New South Wales who succeeded Liberal leader Andrew Peacock in 1990. 

In November 1991 the Liberal Party launched the 650-page Fightback! policy document − a radical collection of "dry", economic liberal measures including: 
the introduction of a goods and services tax (GST), 
various changes to Medicare including the abolition of bulk billing for non-concession holders, 
the introduction of a nine-month limit on unemployment benefits, 
various changes to industrial relations including the abolition of industrial award, 
a $13 billion personal income tax cut directed at middle and upper income earners, 
$10 billion in government spending cuts, 
the abolition of state payroll taxes and the privatisation of a large number of government-owned enterprises.  
All of this presented a vision of a very different future direction to the Keynesian economic conservatism practiced by previous Liberal/National Coalition governments. The 15 percent GST was the centrepiece of the policy document.

Following the December 1991 Labor leadership spill, where former Treasurer Paul Keating ousted Bob Hawke as Prime Minister, Keating mounted a campaign against the Fightback package, and particularly against the GST throughout 1992.  Keating described the GST as an attack on the working class in that it shifted the tax burden from direct taxation of the wealthy to indirect taxation as a broad-based consumption tax. Pressure group activity and public opinion critical of the GST was relentless leading Hewson to exempt food from the proposed GST. However the exclusions announced by Hewson led to questions surrounding the complexity of what precisely which food items would and would not be exempt from the GST. Hewson's difficulty in explaining this to the electorate was exemplified in the infamous birthday cake interview, considered by some as a turning point in the election campaign. Keating won a record fifth consecutive Labor term and a record 13 years in government at the 1993 election, a level of political success not previously seen by federal Labor. A number of the proposals were later adopted in to law in some form, to a small extent during the Keating Labor government, and to a larger extent during the John Howard Liberal government (most famously the GST), while unemployment benefits and bulk billing were re-targeted for a time by the Tony Abbott Liberal government.

The Australian Electoral Study conducted after the election showed 70 per cent of respondents had tuned in to the Keating-Hewson televised debates, the highest ever viewership for Australian election debates. Nine Network debates saw the infamous "worm" being introduced for the first time to its screens during the debate. The "worm" wriggled along the bottom of the screen, rising and falling away on the reactions of a chosen audience. It was reported that Keating scored big-time with the worm when he savaged Hewson over his plans for a GST during the debate.

The election-eve Newspoll reported the Liberal/National Coalition on a 50.5 percent two-party-preferred vote, with Paul Keating's personal ratings being significantly negative.

For the first time since the 1966 election, an incumbent government had increased their two-party-preferred vote.

There was an unusual circumstance in the division of Dickson. One of the candidates, an independent, died very shortly before the election, making it necessary to hold a supplementary election on 17 April. Following the return of the Labor Party to government, Keating announced the makeup of the Second Keating Ministry to be sworn in on 24 March, but kept the portfolio of Attorney-General of Australia open for Michael Lavarch subject to him winning Dickson on 17 April. He won the seat, and was appointed to the ministry on 27 April.

Results

House of Representatives results

Senate results

Seats changing hands

 Members listed in italics did not contest their seat at this election

See also
 Candidates of the Australian federal election, 1993
 Members of the Australian House of Representatives, 1993–1996
 Members of the Australian Senate, 1993–1996
 Birthday cake interview – Hewson's difficulty in explaining how GST would apply to a birthday cake during a news interview said to have contributed to Hewson's defeat.

Notes

References

University of WA  election results in Australia since 1890
AEC 2PP vote
AustralianPolitics.com election details

Federal elections in Australia
1993 elections in Australia
Keating Government
March 1993 events in Australia